Qazqanchay Rural District is in Arjomand District of Firuzkuh County, Tehran province, Iran. At the National Census of 2006, its population was 2,931 in 724 households. There were 1,563 inhabitants in 491 households at the following census of 2011. At the most recent census of 2016, the population of the rural district was 1,903 in 666 households. The largest of its six villages was Lazur, with 1,288 people.

References 

Firuzkuh County

Rural Districts of Tehran Province

Populated places in Tehran Province

Populated places in Firuzkuh County